Sal is a given name and nickname, the latter often of Salvatore.

Artists and entertainers 

 Sal Abruscato (born 1970), American drummer
 Silvio Sal Buscema (born 1936), American comic book artist
 Sal Governale (born 1968), American comedian, radio personality, pizzeria expert, stockbroker, member of The Howard Stern Show
 Salvatore Sal Iacono (born 1971), American comedian
 Salvatore Sal Mineo (1939–1976), American actor
 Salvatore Sal Nistico (1938–1991), American jazz tenor saxophonist
 Sal Salvador (1925–1999), American bebop jazz guitarist and music educator
 Sal Solo (born 1961), English singer born Christopher Scott Stevens
 Sal Valentino (born 1942), American rock musician, singer and songwriter, lead singer of The Beau Brummels, born Salvatore Willard Spampinato
 Sal Viscuso (born 1948), American actor
 Sal Vulcano (born 1976), American comedian, television star, and member of The Tenderloins

Athletes 

 Salvador Lucas Barbier, better known as Sal Barbier (born 1969), American skateboarder and footwear designer
Salvatore Sal Bando (born 1944), American retired Major League Baseball player
 Salvatore Interbartolo, better known as Sal Bartolo (1917–2002), American boxer and former WBA featherweight champion
 Salvador Sal Bernal (born 1992), Mexican United Soccer League player
 Salvatore Sal Fasano (born 1971), American retired Major League Baseball catcher
 Salvatore Sal Maglie (1917–1992), American Major League Baseball pitcher
 Sal Olivas (born c. 1946), American college football player
 Salvatore Sal Rinauro (born 1982), American professional wrestler
 Sal Sunseri (born 1959), American football coach
 Salvatore Sal Zizzo Jr. (born 1987), American Major League Soccer player

Politicians 

 Sarah Sal Brinton (born 1955), British politician, President of the Liberal Democrats
 Sal Cannella (born 1943), American politician
 Sal DiDomenico, American politician, member of the Massachusetts Senate since 2010
 Salvatore DiMasi (born 1945), American politician convicted of corruption
 Sal Esquivel (born 1948), American politician
 Sal Santoro (born 1951), American politician

Other 

 Salvador Sal Castro (1933–2013), Mexican-American educator and activist
 Salman Sal Khan (born 1976), American teacher and entrepreneur
 Sal Restivo (born 1940), sociologist/anthropologist

Fictional characters
 An alias of Big Pussy Bonpensiero, on the television series The Sopranos
 Salvatore Sal Maroni, a DC Comics enemy of Batman
 Aunt Sal, on the British soap opera EastEnders, played by South African-British Actress Anna Karen
 Sal Manella, a film director from Phoenix Wright: Ace Attorney
 Sal Minella, a Muppet chimpanzee
 Salvatore Tessio, in the novel The Godfather and the film adaptation and the sequel, The Godfather Part II
 Sal, an animated Futurama character
 SAL 9000, a fictional computer in 2010: Odyssey Two
 Sal Paradise, the protagonist of Jack Kerouac's 1958 novel On The Road
Sal Mustela, optional crew member in Need For Speed Carbon
Sal Fisher, video game protagonist from Steve Gabry's "Sally Face"

Lists of people by nickname
Hypocorisms